The San Diego Film Critics Society Award for Best Cinematography is an award given by the San Diego Film Critics Society to honor the finest directing achievements in filmmaking.

Winners

2000s

2010s

2020s

References
San Diego Film Critics Society  - Awards

Awards for best cinematography